Lake Lime is a lake in the U.S. state of Wisconsin.

A variant name is "Lime Lake". Lake Lime was named for deposits of lime which were processed in a lakeside lime kiln.

References

Lakes of Wisconsin
Bodies of water of Portage County, Wisconsin